Shaogang Township is a township under the administration of Huoqiu County, Anhui, China. , it has 9 villages under its administration.

References 

Township-level divisions of Anhui
Huoqiu County